The Malagasy Olympic Committee (IOC code: MAD) is the National Olympic Committee representing Madagascar.

See also
 Madagascar at the Olympics

References

Madagascar
Madagascar at the Olympics